The Risihorn is a mountain of the Bernese Alps, overlooking Bellwald in the canton of Valais. It lies south of the Setzehorn, at the southern end of the chain lying east of the Fiescher Glacier.

References

External links
 Risihorn on Hikr

Mountains of the Alps
Mountains of Switzerland
Mountains of Valais
Bernese Alps
Two-thousanders of Switzerland